Penca Hill is a rocky hill rising to 217 m in Dospey Heights on Byers Peninsula, Livingston Island in the South Shetland Islands, Antarctica. It surmounts Diomedes Lake on the north.

The feature is part of the Antarctic Specially Protected Area ASPA 126 Byers Peninsula, situated in one of its restricted zones.

The feature is descriptively named, the Spanish penca referring to a fleshy leaf or joint of a plant.

Location

Maps
 Península Byers, Isla Livingston. Mapa topográfico a escala 1:25000. Madrid: Servicio Geográfico del Ejército, 1992.
 L.L. Ivanov. Antarctica: Livingston Island and Greenwich, Robert, Snow and Smith Islands. Scale 1:120000 topographic map. Troyan: Manfred Wörner Foundation, 2009.

Notes

References
 SCAR Composite Antarctic Gazetteer.

Hills of Livingston Island